An election to Waterford County Council took place on 5 June 2009 as part of that year's Irish local elections. 23 councillors were elected from five electoral divisions by PR-STV voting for a five-year term of office. .

Results by party

Results by Electoral Area

Comeragh

Dungarvan

Lismore

Tramore

External links

2009 Irish local elections
2009